Agriphila biarmicus is a species of moth in the family Crambidae first described by Johan Martin Jakob von Tengström in 1865. It is found in Fennoscandia, north-western Russia, Estonia, Latvia and in the Alps of Switzerland, Austria and Italy. It is also found in Canada, including Alberta and Quebec.

The wingspan is about 19 mm for ssp. paganella and 12–13 mm for European subspecies. The forewings are blotchy dark brown, with a whitish discal area and a zigzag subterminal line. There is a row of seven black dots in the terminal line.

Subspecies
Agriphila biarmicus biarmicus (Scandinavia, north-western Russia)
Agriphila biarmicus illatella (Fuchs, 1902) (Scandinavia)
Agriphila biarmicus alpina (Bleszynski, 1957) (Alps)
Agriphila biarmicus paganella (McDunnough, 1925) (North America)

References

Moths described in 1865
Crambini
Moths of Europe
Moths of North America